Delusion (also known as The House Where Death Lives) is a 1980 American psychological horror and slasher film directed by Alan Beattie, and starring Patricia Pearcy, Joseph Cotten, David Hayward, and John Dukakis.

The film's poster art is based on Charles Allan Gilbert's 1892 illustration All Is Vanity.

Plot 
Nurse Meredith Stone recounts, in a letter to her father, her mother's recent death, and details a job she has taken at a Fairlawn estate caring for the wealthy, elderly Ivar Langrock. There, she is greeted by his butler, Phillip, and Jeffrey Fraser, Ivar's attorney. She finds herself almost immediately drawn to a locked room on the second floor of the house. She discovers that Wilfred, Ivar's mentally-challenged son, lives in the room. Meredith develops a friendship with Ivar, even confessing to him that her mother had been institutionalized and that her father had raped her mother.

Shortly after Meredith begins working at Fairlawn, Langrock's adult grandson Gabriel, who spent his life on a commune in Arizona, comes to stay after the accidental death of his parents. After his arrival, a series of deaths begin to occur; Meredith and Ivar discover his dog hanging from a tree in the garden. Wilfred also dies in what appears to be a suicide when he is found having jumped out the window of his room. Gabriel makes sexual advances toward Meredith, who finds herself increasingly uncomfortable around him.

Phillip is murdered in the wine cellar, having been crushed under a fallen wine rack and clobbered with a table leg; the police, however, conclude his death an accident, though Jeffrey accuses Gabriel of his murder. Later in the evening, the house gardener, Alex, is confronted at the Fairlawn estate by the detective in a garage, who tells him the coroner has deemed Philip's death a murder. After he leaves, Alex hears a commotion behind him, and upon returning, he finds the detective dead,. The unseen killer also attacks Alex, beating him to death.

Meredith, while searching the house, discovers a bloodied table leg, and calls Jeffrey, panicked. He tells her he is on his way to the house. Just as Jeffrey arrives, she discovers Gabriel's body stuffed in a closet. Jeffrey confronts her, and tells her that he has just returned from the hospital where Meredith claimed her mother was kept, and reveals that her mother died during Meredith's birth; he also accuses her of the murders, telling her she had been institutionalized for murdering her father, who had molested her. She then attacks Jeffrey with the table leg, and storms downstairs to kill Ivar. However, Ivar manages to knock her unconscious with a cane.

The film close as Meredith narrates her letter to her father, saying that maybe she will be able to return to Fairlawn one day to take care of Ivar.

Cast 
 Patricia Pearcy as Meredith Stone
 David Hayward as Jeffrey Fraser
 John Dukakis as Gabriel Langrock
 Leon Charles as Phillip
 Alice Nunn as Duffy
 Patrick Pankhurst as Wilfred Langrock
 Joseph Cotten as Ivar Langrock
 Louis Basile as Taxi Driver
 Abraham Alvarez as Alex
 Simone Griffeth as Pamela Barton
 James Purcell as Detective
 Shelby Leverington as Additional Dialogue (voice)
 George P. Wilbur as Stunts

Release 
The film was released in March 1980 in the US, and again in May 1981, under the title The House Where Death Lives, by New American Films, New World Pictures, and The International Picture Show Company

It was also released on VHS by both Embassy Pictures and Sultan Video.

Reception 

Retro Slashers.net reviewer Thomas Ellsion gave the film a positive review, stating that "Delusion is a subdued slasher that relies more on the skills of a veteran cast, a deliberate pace, and a twist ending" and it is "worth seeking out for fans of slashers with a heavy dose of whodunit mystery."

AllMovie, however, gave the film a negative review, stating that "slow-moving and low-key."

Notes and references

Notes

References

External links 

 

1980 films
1980s slasher films
1980 horror films
American psychological horror films
American thriller films
1980s English-language films
1980s American films